The 2019 Korea National League was the 17th and the last season of the Korea National League, the third-highest division of the South Korean football league system. After this season, the semi-professional clubs in South Korea entered the newly-developed K3 League.

Teams

Regular season

League table

Results

Matches 1–14

Matches 15–28

Championship playoffs

Top scorers
Seo Dong-hyeon won the top scorer award due to a smaller number of appearances.

Attendance

See also
2019 in South Korean football
2019 Korea National League Championship
2019 Korean FA Cup

References

External links
RSSSF

Korea National League seasons
2019 in South Korean football
2019 in Asian association football leagues